Mathias Brugman (birth name: Mathias Brugman Duliebre) (January 3, 1811 – September 30, 1868), a.k.a. Mathias Bruckman, was a leader in Puerto Rico's independence revolution against Spain known as El Grito de Lares (English: The Cry of Lares).

Early years
Brugman's father was Pierre Brugman from Curaçao of Dutch–Jewish Sephardic ancestry and his mother, Isabel Duliebre from Puerto Rico. They met and married in New Orleans, Louisiana where Brugman was born, raised and educated.

The Brugman family moved to Puerto Rico and settled in the City of Mayagüez where Mathias met and married Ana Maria Laborde. He opened a colmado (grocery store) and became rather successful, only to lose a good part of his fortune attempting to grow coffee. Like many other residents of Puerto Rico at the time, he resented the political injustices practiced by Spain on the island. This led him to become a believer in the cause of the Puerto Rican independence movement.

Independence advocate
Brugman admired independence advocates Ramón Emeterio Betances and Segundo Ruiz Belvis. It was this admiration which inspired him to become an outspoken advocate for Puerto Rico's independence.

In his Colmado, people would normally gather on a daily basis to discuss politics. Brugman eventually befriended Manuel Rojas and his brother Miguel and together with his son, Hector joined them in a conspiracy to revolt against Spain. Together, with a group of other patriots, they formed revolutionary committees. These committees were mainly based on the west coast towns of Puerto Rico. The first revolutionary committee formed was Mathias Brugman's in Mayagüez. He used his Colmado as his headquarters and his cell was code named: "Capa Prieta" (Black Cape). Manuel Rojas committee in Lares was code named "Centro Bravo" (Bravo Center).

El Grito de Lares
On September 23, 1868, the revolution began and the town of Lares was taken in what was to be known as El "Grito de Lares" (English: Cry of Lares). The revolutionists declared Puerto Rico to be the free "Republic of Puerto Rico".  However, the Spanish were already forewarned and soon defeated the small Army of liberators.

Mathias Brugman, his son Hector and Baldomero Baurer (a fellow revolutionist) went into hiding. Many of the others were either killed or imprisoned, including Manuel Rojas and Mariana Bracetti. On September 30, 1868, a farm worker, Francisco Quiñones, who worked in the Asunción Plantation, betrayed Brugman, his son and Baurer and led the Spanish authorities to where they were hiding. The men refused to surrender and eventually were executed. Mathias Brugman died in the town of Yauco, Puerto Rico in 1868.

See also

List of Puerto Ricans
Jewish immigration to Puerto Rico
History of the Jews in Puerto Rico

References

External links
Brugman

1812 births
1868 deaths
People from New Orleans
Puerto Rican Jews
Puerto Rican rebels
Imprisoned Puerto Rican independence activists
Puerto Rican independence activists
Puerto Rican people of Dutch descent
19th-century Puerto Rican people
19th-century Sephardi Jews